A number of steamships have been named Alster, including -

, 806 GRT, built by S P Austin & Son, Sunderland.
, 573 GRT, built by Joh. C. Tecklenborg, Wesermünde
, 997 GRT, built by Reihersteig Schiffswerke, Hamburg
, 8,514 GRT, built by Deutsche Werft, Hamburg
, 299 GRT, built by Denny & Rankine, Dumbarton, Scotland

Ship names